Matej Deković (born 19 September 1993) is a Croatian professional footballer who plays as a defender for Egersunds IK.

Club career
Deković spent three years at the University of North Carolina at Charlotte following time with a handful of clubs in his native Croatia. On 17 January 2017, Deković was drafted in the fourth round (69th overall) of the 2017 MLS SuperDraft by Chicago Fire. He signed with the club on 27 February 2017.

On 20 March 2017, Deković signed on loan with United Soccer League side Tulsa Roughnecks.
In 2019 he signed for Norwegian third-tier club Flekkerøy IL. On 8 December 2020, he signed a 2-years contract for Egersund

References

External links 
 
 Matej Dekovic at NFF

1993 births
Living people
Footballers from Zagreb
Association football defenders
Croatian footballers
Charlotte 49ers men's soccer players
NK HAŠK players
Chicago Fire FC draft picks
Chicago Fire FC players
FC Tulsa players
Flekkerøy IL players
Egersunds IK players
First Football League (Croatia) players
USL Championship players
Norwegian Second Division players
Croatian expatriate footballers
Expatriate soccer players in the United States
Croatian expatriate sportspeople in the United States
Expatriate footballers in Norway
Croatian expatriate sportspeople in Norway